Drop Dead Gorgeous or drop-dead gorgeous may refer to:

 "Drop Dead Gorgeous" (song), a 1997 song by Republica
 Drop Dead Gorgeous (film), a 1999 film directed by Michael Patrick Jann
 Drop Dead Gorgeous (TV series), a 2006 BBC television series
 Drop Dead, Gorgeous, a post-hardcore band from Colorado, founded in 2004
 Drop Dead Gorgeous, a 2010 independent film featuring actor Jeremy London
 "Drop Dead Gorgeous", 2001 Aerosmith song from their album Just Push Play
 "Drop Dead Gorgeous", an episode in season one of Tru Calling aired in 2004

See also
 Dead Gorgeous, a 2010 Australian television series